Ovacık is a village in the district of Lüleburgaz in Kırklareli Province, in the Marmara region of Turkey.

Population

Villages in Lüleburgaz District